The Return of Mr. Moto (also known as Mr Moto and the Persian Oil Case) is a 1965 British crime film directed by Ernest Morris and starring Henry Silva, Terence Longdon, and Suzanne Lloyd.

Plot
Mr. Moto is brought in by British intelligence to assist in their investigation of a plot to drive a major oil company out of business. Moto meets his old friend, Russell McAllister an American oil company executive, at a London restaurant. McAllister tells Moto that his company's operations in Iran are threatened by a campaign of sabotage and the Shahrdar of Wadi (a stand-in for the Shah of Iran) is threatening to cancel his company's lease. McAllister also believes that his own life is in danger. As McAllister and Moto leave the restaurant, the former is gunned down in a drive-by shooting. The car's driver, the Englishman Coburn and the assassin, the German Helmut "Dargo" Engle set off in pursuit of Moto who was slightly wounded down the dark streets of London. Engle, a former SS officer revels in killing and mocks Coburn for his nervousness, saying "the Oriental" as he calls Moto will be easy prey. When Moto goes into an abandoned house, Coburn follows him while Engle waits outside. Moto defeats Coburn in hand-to-hand combat and forces him to reveal he is working for a man who he only knows as "Dargo". When Coburn attempts to escape, Engle sees him and guns him down for his cowardice. Engle then enters the building, but Moto is able to escape by jumping off the roof.

The next day, Moto meets with his Interpol contact, Charles Ginelli, and the two find out that "Dargo" is really the former SS Sturmbannführer Helmut Engle who is currently wanted for war crimes committed in the Second World War. Moto states that as McAllister was a friend, he will revenge him by killing Engle. Engle for his part expresses much fury when his paymasters complained that he failed to kill Moto, vowing next time he will kill "the Oriental".  Moto meets Chief Inspector Marlow of Scotland Yard who provides him with McAllister's briefcase. Moto searches it and finds hidden in a cigarette a cryptogram containing an enigmatic mixture of letters and numbers. Marolow tells Moto that he will be sending over Inspector Jim Halliday to assist him. Subsequently, Jonathan Westering of MI5 arrives at Moto's apartment and states that a summit of leading oil company executives and diplomats will be meeting at his house soon. Moto agrees to work with Westering and share information.

Later, a man arrives and identifies himself as Halliday, claims to have an important contact at the Arabian Nights restaurant. At the Arabian Nights, Moto and Halldiay watch a belly dancer perform. Halliday turns out to be the criminal Chapman and Moto is taken prisoner. Moto meets the leader of the conspiracy, Wasir Hussein, the private secretary to the Shahrdar. After being tortured by Engle, Moto is dumped into the Thames with a brick tied around him. Moto is able to escape and has Ginelli print his obituary. Moto meets the real Halliday. For the summit, an American oil executive David Lennox arrives together with his mistress, Maxine Powell, who poses as his secretary. At Westering's house, Lennox speaks about Powell in a vulgar manner saying he did not hire for her typing skills, causes her to seek the company of Halliday and Moto. Lennox gives Moto his company codebook to assist with breaking the cryptogram.  

Moto suggests that Powell speak at the summit about having some vital information as a way to unsettle Hussein. Moto poses as a Japanese diplomat at the summit and is able to persuade the Shahrdar to not to cancel Lennox's lease and award it to Hussein's company. Because Powell says she knows something, Hussein has Engle kidnap her. At gunpoint, Powell calls Moto and says she is at the Arabian Knights. Moto arrives and is able to outwit and kill Engle. Just before he dies, Engle says that McAllister was working with Hussein and was killed after he got too greedy. The Shahrdar then arrives at the Arabian Knights together with Halliday and Hussein. Moto has broken the cryptogram and exposes Hussein to the Shahrdar as the leader of the conspiracy. Westering then arrives to congratulate Moto, but the latter exposes him as also being in league with Hussein. After the conspiracy is broken up, Moto persuades Powell to spend the weekend with him at his London hotel room.

Cast
 Henry Silva – Mr. Moto
 Terence Longdon – Jonathan Westering, MI5
 Suzanne Lloyd – Maxine Powell
 Martin Wyldeck – Helmut "Dargo" Engle
 Marne Maitland – Wasir Hussein
 Brian Coburn – Magda, Hussein's Henchman
 Stanley Morgan – Inspector Jim Halliday
 Peter Zander – Charles Ginelli
 Harold Kasket – Shahrdar of Wadi
 Antony Booth – Hovath
 Gordon Tanner – Russell McAllister
 Henry Gilbert – David Lennox
 Richard Evans – Chief Inspector Marlow
 Ian Fleming – Rogers
 Denis Holmes – Chapman
 Tracy Connell – Arab
 Alister Williamson – Maitre d'
 Sonyia Benjamin – Dancer

Production
The last Mr Moto book was Stopover Tokyo which was turned into a film without Moto in 1957.

Reception
The New York Times called it "extremely garrulous and inane".

Home media
This film, along with Mr. Moto in Danger Island, Mr. Moto's Gamble, Mr. Moto's Last Warning and Mr. Moto Takes a Vacation, was released on DVD in 2007 by 20th Century Fox as part of The Mr. Moto Collection, Volume Two, albeit as a DVD extra.

References

External links

 
 

1965 films
Films directed by Ernest Morris
Films scored by Douglas Gamley
1965 crime films
British crime films
20th Century Fox films
Films set in London
1960s English-language films
1960s British films